Bongir or Bon Gir may refer to:
 Bongir, Kohgiluyeh and Boyer-Ahmad
 Bon Gir, Sistan and Baluchestan